Fenerbahçe Table Tennis is the men's and women's table tennis department of Fenerbahçe S.K., a major Turkish multi-sport club based in Istanbul, Turkey. The table tennis section of Fenerbahçe, which was founded in 1928, is the most successful in Turkey and one of the best in Europe, with the men's team having won the Turkish Super League 4 times and the Turkish Cup 11 times, among others. They were also ETTU Cup runners-up in the 2007–08 season, the best achievement for any Turkish team in European competitions so far. In the 2009–10 season they also reached the quarter-finals.

The women's team reached the European Champions League final in two consecutive seasons, in 2013–14 and 2014–15, being the first and only Turkish club that ever played in a Champions League Final, and they eventually won the Champions League title in 2015, thus achieving the first and only Triple Crown ever for a Turkish team. Furthermore, the second-tier ETTU Cup was won two times in a row, in 2011–12 and 2012–13, which is also a Turkish record. Throughout the years they dominated Turkish table tennis by winning the Turkish Super League a record 12 times and a record 13 Turkish Cups, among others.

Fenerbahçe Table Tennis players used to train in the Dereağzı Facilities. 
The teams play their home games in the Ülker Sports Arena with a capacity of 12,500, which opened in 2012.

Honours (Men)

European competitions
  ETTU Cup
 Runners-up (1): 2007–08

National competitions
 Turkish Super League
  Winners (4): 2006–07, 2007–08, 2008–09, 2015–16
 Runners-up (8): 1985–86, 1987–88, 2001–02, 2005–06, 2011–12, 2012–13, 2013–14, 2014–15
 Turkish Cup
  Winners (11) (shared-record): 1964, 1968, 1970, 1972, 1979, 1983, 2005–06, 2006–07, 2008–09, 2011–12, 2014–15
 Runners-up (9): 1971, 1974, 1980, 1981, 1982, 1983–84, 1984–85, 2007–08, 2015–16

Regional competitions
 Istanbul Championship
  Winners (23) (record): 1930, 1948, 1949, 1950, 1951, 1952, 1953, 1962, 1963, 1964, 1965, 1968, 1969, 1970, 1973, 1978, 1979, 1981, 1982, 1983, 1984, 1985, 2002

Honours (Women)

European competitions
  European Champions League
  Winners (1): 2014–15
 Runners-up (1): 2013–14
  ETTU Cup
  Winners (2): 2011–12, 2012–13
 Triple Crown
 Winners (1): 2014–15

National competitions
 Turkish Super League
  Winners (12) (record): 1998–99, 1999–2000, 2000–01, 2001–02, 2007–08, 2009–10, 2010–11, 2011–12, 2012–13, 2013–14, 2014–15, 2015–16
 Runners-up (4): 2002–03, 2005–06, 2006–07, 2008–09
 Turkish Cup
  Winners (13) (record): 1968, 1998–99, 1999–2000, 2000–01, 2001–02, 2006–07, 2007–08, 2008–09, 2010–11, 2011–12, 2012–13, 2013–14, 2014–15

Regional competitions
 Istanbul Championship
  Winners (11): 1964, 1965, 1966, 1967, 1968, 1970, 1976, 1999, 2000, 2001, 2002

Technical and managerial staff

Current squads

References

External links
Official website 
Fenerbahçe Table Tennis site 

Table Tennis
Sport in Istanbul
Table tennis in Turkey
1928 establishments in Turkey